The 2004 Tippmix Budapest Grand Prix was a women's tennis tournament played on outdoor clay courts in Budapest, Hungary that was part of the Tier V category of the 2004 WTA Tour. It was the tenth edition of the tournament and was held from 26 April until 2 May 2004. Eighth-seeded Jelena Janković won the singles title and earned $16,000 first-prize money.

Finals

Singles
 Jelena Janković defeated  Martina Suchá 7–6(7–4), 6–3
 It was Janković's first singles title of her career.

Doubles
 Petra Mandula /  Barbara Schett defeated  Virág Németh /  Ágnes Szávay 6–3, 6–2

External links
 ITF tournament edition details
 Tournament draws

Colortex Budapest Grand Prix
Budapest Grand Prix
Buda
Buda